Dysoptus bilobus is a species of moth in the family name Arrhenophanidae. It is known only from the type locality, a lowland, tropical rainforest habitat in Costa Rica.

The length of the forewings is 3.8–5 mm for males.

Etymology
The specific name is derived from the Latin hi (two, double) and lobus (a rounded projection), in reference to the diagnostic bilobed apex of the sacculus in the male genitalia.

External links
Family Arrhenophanidae

Dysoptus
Taxa named by Donald R. Davis (entomologist)
Moths described in 2012